The Mayor of Jaffna is the head of the Jaffna Municipal Council, the local authority for the city of Jaffna in northern Sri Lanka. The seat is currently vacant.

Mayors and chairmen

Notes

References

Sources

 

 
Jaffna